NA-264 Quetta-III is a newly-created constituency for the National Assembly of Pakistan. It mainly comprises the areas of the Quetta City Tehsil as well as census charges 13 and 14 of Quetta city.

Assembly Segments

Members of Parliament

2018-2022: NA-266 Quetta-III

Election 2018

General elections were held on 25 July 2018.

See also
NA-263 Quetta-II
NA-265 Ziarat-cum-Pishin-cum-Karezat

References 

Quetta